Jeffrey Egbe (born 27 May 1998) is an Austrian footballer who plays for FC Wacker Innsbruck II.

External links
 
 

Austrian footballers
1998 births
Living people
FC Wacker Innsbruck (2002) players
2. Liga (Austria) players
Austrian Regionalliga players
Association football midfielders